is the 8th Case Closed feature film. The film was released in Japan on April 17, 2004. A Region 2 DVD has been released by Universal Pictures. The film brought a box office income of 2.8 billion yen.

Plot
A stage actress, Julie wants to use her star sapphire for her upcoming play and asks for Mouri Kogoro  help to protect it after showing Kogoro a letter from the Kaito Kid. On the day of the theft, Kid appears at the theatre disguised up as Shinichi Kudo but ends up fleeing in the end without the jewel. To thank them, Julie invites Kogoro and everyone to Hakodate, and they all travel on an airplane to get there. In the air, one of the show actor, Shinjo, who was supposed to be elsewhere and Ran's mother, Eri, joins them on the plane. As the plane takes off, Julie comes in physical contact with most of the individuals she invited, making them all suspects in the case of her death. The case was solved by Eri and the culprit was later found to be the makeup artist, Natsuki.

The captains were also poisoned from Julie and were not able to pilot the plane, so Shinjo agrees to take over because he supposedly "took courses", and appoints Conan to assist him. Conan figures out that Shinjo is Kaito Kid when Conan is asked to assist, as this logic would not apply in a similar situation. Kid tells Conan that he is no longer interested in the sapphire as he discovered that it was a fake. The storm and fire at the airport make it impossible to land while the plane fuel is running low. Conan picks a stable area that can support a commercial plane. Ran Mori and Sonoko Suzuki eventually take over piloting the plane while Kid escapes by jumping off the plane and Conan has to "go to the bathroom." Conan then switches over to Shinichi's voice and guides Ran for landing the plane. During the flight, Ran mentions how Shinichi is like an eclipse; one moment he's there, the other he's not. When the plane lands, Ran tells Shinichi that she loves him, but ends the moment by telling him that she suddenly sees lights at the site.

It turns out that Kid went near a police station and used police cars (because this policeman is obsessed with catching him) as guiding lights to land the plane. After the plane safely lands, the criminal is apprehended and Ran and Sonoko are treated by a medic. The medic reveals himself to be Kaito Kid, who commends Ran for landing the plane safely. He tells her they will meet again before suddenly vanishing. All went well, and the movie ends with Ran talking to Shinichi over the phone again arguing about silly things, thinking that it was Kid who guided her to land the plane, and is relieved that her secret isn't out.

Cast
Akira Kamiya as Kogoro Mouri
Kappei Yamaguchi as Shinichi Kudo and Kaito Kid
Minami Takayama as Conan Edogawa
Wakana Yamazaki as Ran Mouri
Chafurin as Inspector Megure
Kazuhiko Inoue as Officer Shiratori
Ikue Ohtani as Mitsuhiko Tsuburaya
Megumi Hayashibara as Ai Haibara
Naoko Matsui as Sonoko Suzuki
Wataru Takagi  as Genta Kojima and Officer Takagi
Yukiko Iwai as Ayumi Yoshida

Music
The theme song is "Dream x Dream" which plays during the credits was written and performed by Rina Aiuchi. It was released April 28, 2004.

The official soundtrack is released on April 4, 2004. It costs ¥3059, including tax.

Home media

DVD
The DVD was released on December 15, 2004. It contains the film and the trailer and costs ¥6090 with tax included.

Blu-ray
The Blu-ray version of the film was released on December 24, 2010. The Blu-ray contains the same content of the DVD plus a mini-booklet explaining the film.

Box office
Opening Weekend: $3,716,785 (Japan, 285 Theaters)
Total: ¥2,800,000,000 / $27,000,000 (Japan, Rough Figure)

References

External links
 
Official TMS website  
Official TMS website 

2004 anime films
TMS Entertainment
Toho films
Films directed by Yasuichiro Yamamoto
Japanese aviation films
Animated films about aviation
Animated films set in Tokyo
Films set in Hakodate
Films set on airplanes
Magician of the Silver Sky